Mehmed Emin Rauf Pasha  (1780–1860) was an Ottoman industrialist and statesman, who was Grand Vizier of the Ottoman Empire twice under Mahmud II (reign 1808–1839) and three times under Abdülmecit I (reign 1839–1861) during the Tanzimat period.

According to Shaw and Shaw, Mehmed Emin Rauf Pasha and his predecessor, Mustafa Reşit Pasha, "acted mainly as mediators" for Mahmud II, "attempting to balance conflicting interests while participating in the factional activities and disputes endemic in Ottoman governmental life."

References 

Shaw, S. J. and Shaw, E. Z. (1997). History of the Ottoman Empire, Volume 2. Cambridge: Cambridge University Press.

1780 births
1859 deaths
Pashas
19th-century Grand Viziers of the Ottoman Empire
Ottoman governors of Damascus
Turks from the Ottoman Empire
Ottoman people of the Egyptian–Ottoman War (1839–1841)